The 2016 season was the second season of competitive association football played by Bali United Football Club, a professional football club based in Gianyar, Bali, Indonesia. This season, they competed in the Indonesia Soccer Championship A, a football tournament that replaced the temporarily-suspended Indonesia Super League.

This season was the first time Bali United ended a full-competition season after 2015 Indonesia Super League was disbanded, having finished in 12th.

Pre-season and friendlies

Friendlies

Bali Island Cup

Bhayangkara Cup

Trofeo Persija

Trofeo Bali Celebest

Match results

Soccer Championship A

Player details

Appearances and goals 

|- class="sortbottom"
! colspan="14"| Players transferred out during the season
|-

Disciplinary record 

|- class="sortbottom"
! colspan="14"| Players transferred out during the season
|-

Transfers

Transfers in

Transfers out

Loans in

References 

Bali United F.C. seasons
Bali United